was a Japanese monk of the Rinzai school (one of three main schools of Zen Buddhism in Japan, the others being the Sōtō school and the much smaller Ōbaku school). He was known for his controversial teachings and writings, as well as for his lighthearted sumi-e paintings. After spending half of his life in Nagata near Yokohama, he secluded himself in Shōfuku-ji in Fukuoka, the first Zen temple in Japan, where he spent the rest of his life.

Though the Rinzai sect is particularly known for its hard-to-understand teachings, Sengai tried to make them accessible to the public.

Works
One of his most notable paintings depicts a circle, a square and a triangle. Sengai left the painting without a title or inscription, save for his signature. The painting is often called "Maru-Sankaku-Shikaku", written as "〇△□", or "The Universe" when referred to in English.

See also
Buddhism in Japan
List of Rinzai Buddhists

External links

 Idemitsu Museum Sengai Collection (Japanese)
 Kyushu University collection of images (Japanese)
 Review of the exhibition at the Idemitsu Museum

1750 births
1837 deaths
Japanese painters
Rinzai Buddhists
Buddhist artists
Japanese Zen Buddhists
Edo period Buddhist clergy
Zenga